Malcolm Rosas Jr (born 27 June 2001) is a professional Australian rules footballer who plays for the Gold Coast Football Club in the Australian Football League (AFL).

Early life
Rosas Jr was born and raised in Darwin, Northern Territory. His mother is of Indigenous Australian descent from the Northern Territory (Ngalakgan and Rembarrnga) and his father is of South Sea Islander descent from Queensland. Rosas Jr's grandfather, Bill Dempsey, is a 2022 Australian Football Hall of Fame inductee, an inaugural Hall of Fame inductee in both the WAFL and AFL Northern Territory as well as being named in the Indigenous Team of the Century in 2005. Rosas Jr grew up playing Australian rules football, rugby league and soccer at high levels but eventually chose to focus on football in his mid-teenage years. He played all his junior football for the Darwin Buffaloes in the NTFL and signed to play senior football for the NT Thunder in the NEAFL in his final year of junior football in 2019.

AFL career
In October 2019, Rosas Jr was drafted to the Gold Coast Suns via their academy pre-selection access. He made his AFL debut at 19 years of age in round 9, 2021 against the Brisbane Lions in QClash 20 at Metricon Stadium.

References

External links

2001 births
Living people
Indigenous Australian players of Australian rules football
Australian rules footballers from the Northern Territory
Northern Territory Football Club players
Gold Coast Football Club players